Tagarg Ab (also Romanized as Tagarg Āb) is a village in Dowrahan Rural District, Gandoman District, Borujen County, Chaharmahal and Bakhtiari Province, Iran. At the 2006 census, its population was 119, in 22 families. The village is populated by Lurs and speakers of a distinct Turkic dialect.

References 

Populated places in Borujen County
Luri settlements in Chaharmahal and Bakhtiari Province